Jee Seok-jin (born February 10, 1966) is a South Korean comedian, singer, television presenter, actor, and broadcaster. He graduated from Ajou University with a bachelor's degree in Business Administration.

In 1992, Jee Seok-jin debuted as a singer, releasing his first album "I Know", but gained popularity as an MC and comedian in the entertainment industry. He was most commonly known as the main MC in Star Golden Bell, which aired from 2004 to 2010. Jee is most well known as a cast member in the variety show Running Man together with Yoo Jae-suk, Kim Jong-kook, Haha, Song Ji-hyo, Lee Kwang-soo, Jeon So-min and Yang Se-chan. In addition to his television career, he also hosts the afternoon radio show 2 O'Clock Date on MBC FM4U.

Personal life
Jee met his wife through an introduction from Yoo Jae-seok. Jee and his wife celebrated their 20th wedding anniversary in January 2017. Their "second wedding" was aired on Running Man in a special episode called "Big Nose Week" (alluding to Jee's nickname on the show). They have a son, Jee Hyun-woo, who made a rare appearance on a Running Man episode in 2015.

In August 2022, Jee has signed a contract with Uzurocks Entertainment.

Discography

Album
 1992: I Know

Singles

Radio

Filmography

Television show

Web shows

Music video appearances

Awards and nominations

Notes

References

External links
 
 
 

1966 births
Living people
Ajou University alumni
People from Seoul
South Korean comedians
South Korean male television actors
South Korean television presenters
Chungju Ji clan
FNC Entertainment artists